Eric Leslie Crabtree (born November 3, 1944) is a former American football wide receiver in the American Football League (AFL) and the National Football League (NFL). He played six seasons for the Denver Broncos (1966–1968), the Cincinnati Bengals (1969–1971), and the New England Patriots (1971).

See also 
 List of NCAA major college yearly punt and kickoff return leaders
 Other American Football League players

1944 births
Living people
People from Monessen, Pennsylvania
Players of American football from Pennsylvania
American football wide receivers
Pittsburgh Panthers football players
Denver Broncos (AFL) players
Cincinnati Bengals players
New England Patriots players
American Football League players